The article contains information about the 2012–13 Iran 2nd Division football season. This is the 3rd rated football competition in Iran after the Azadegan League and Persian Gulf Cup.

The league is composed of 28 teams divided into two divisions of 14 teams each, whose teams will be divided geographically.  Teams will play only other teams in their own division, once at home and once away for a total of 26 matches each.

In each division, two teams are promoted to Azadegan League, and two teams are relegated to Iran Football's 3rd Division plus the relegation playoff loser. In total, the league promotes 4 teams to Azadegan League and relegates 9 teams to 3rd Division.

The league started from September 2012.

Teams

Stadia and locations

Group A

Stadia and locations

Group B

Standings

Group A

Group B

Relegation play-off

The loser will be relegated to 2013–14 Iran Football's 3rd Division.

References

League 2 (Iran) seasons
3